The 1948 United States Senate election in Oklahoma took place on November 2, 1948. Incumbent Republican Senator Edward H. Moore declined to run for re-election. A crowded Democratic primary, including the former Governor, multiple members of Congress, and several statewide elected officials, developed; former Governor Robert S. Kerr won a slim plurality in the initial primary and then defeated former Congressman Gomer Smith by a wide margin in the runoff. On the Republican side, Congressman Ross Rizley had an easy path to the nomination. Kerr defeated Rizley in a landslide, largely similar to President Harry S. Truman's landslide victory in Oklahoma over Republican presidential nominee Thomas E. Dewey.

Democratic primary

Candidates
 Robert S. Kerr, former Governor of Oklahoma
 Gomer Smith, former U.S. Congressman from Oklahoma's 5th congressional district
 Mac Q. Williamson, Attorney General of Oklahoma
 O. J. Fox, pension organizer
 Glen D. Johnson, U.S. Congressman from Oklahoma's 4th congressional district
 Wilburn Cartwright, Oklahoma Secretary of State
 James E. Berry, Lieutenant Governor of Oklahoma
 Fletcher Riley, Justice on the Oklahoma Supreme Court
 C. A. Gentry
 L. G. Burt

Results

Runoff election results

Republican primary

Candidates
 Ross Rizley, U.S. Congressman from Oklahoma's 8th congressional district
 Henry J. Wallace
 Frank A. Anderson
 Homer Cowan
 Joseph Holt
 Rexford B. Cragg

Results

General election

Results

References

Oklahoma
1948
1948 Oklahoma elections